Netflix Animation is an American animation studio and a subsidiary of Netflix. It was founded on November 6, 2018. The studio primarily produces and develops animated programs and feature films.

History 
When Netflix began to produce original animated content in 2013, all of them were produced by third-party companies, mostly DreamWorks Animation Television. However, in November 2018, it was announced that Netflix was developing original animated projects in-house including Klaus and Kid Cosmic.

In April 2022, Phil Rynda was laid off from the studio, after a series of corporate struggles and strategic shifts within Netflix, with several projects being canceled as a result. Several people at the studio have left in favor of working at Cartoon Network Studios, Nickelodeon Animation Studio, Disney Television Animation, Amazon, and Apple TV+, among other studios. Head of adult animation Mike Moon would later depart to start Moonlight under Illumination.

Upon the company's intent of acquiring Australian animation/visual effects studio Animal Logic in July 2022, Melissa Cobb stepped down as vice president of film animation whilst still on board as producer with Karen Toliver as her replacement.

In September 2022, Netflix Animation laid off 30 employees in a part of restructuring plan.

Filmography

Feature films

Upcoming

In development

Television series

Upcoming

In development

Miniseries

Upcoming

In development

Specials

Upcoming

In development

Shorts

Canceled projects

Notes

References

2018 establishments in California
American companies established in 2018
Mass media companies established in 2018
Netflix
Netflix Animation
American animation studios
American corporate subsidiaries
Companies based in Los Angeles